The Australia blind cricket team is the national blind cricket team of Australia.It has been organized and run by the Blind Cricket Australia. Australia blind cricket team participates in One Day Internationals and T20 Internationals. Australian team also participated in the inaugural Blind Cricket World Cup in 1998 and ended up as semifinalists. The team generally participated in every editions of the Blind cricket world cups.

Tournament History

40 Over Blind Cricket World Cup 
 1998 Blind Cricket World Cup-Semifinalists
 2002 Blind Cricket World Cup-Semifinalists
 2006 Blind Cricket World Cup-Groupstage
 2014 Blind Cricket World Cup-Groupstage

Blind T20 World Cup 
 2012 Blind World T20-Groupstage
 2017 Blind World T20-Groupstage

References

External links 
 Official website of Blind Cricket Australia (BCA)

Blind cricket teams
Australian Paralympic teams
Parasports in Australia